William R. Allen is a former President of the British Dental Association.

References

English cricket administrators
English dentists
Officers of the Order of the British Empire
People from Bognor Regis
Year of birth missing (living people)
Living people